Got Nuffin is the sixth EP by indie rock band Spoon, released by Merge Records on June 30, 2009. The title single, which was recorded at Rare Book Room in Brooklyn with Deerhunter engineer Nicolas Vernhes, reached #43 on Billboard Rock Songs chart in May 2010, and subsequently appeared on Spoon's 2010 album Transference.

Reception
The EP received a rating of 7/10 from Pitchfork Media.

Track listing
 "Got Nuffin" – 3:56
 "Tweakers" – 3:43
 "Stroke Their Brains" – 3:31
 "Tweakers (Remix)" – 4:02

In the media
The title track was used in the closing scene of the seventh season finale of the medical drama series House, as well as the episode "Chuck Versus Operation Awesome" of the comedy-drama series Chuck.

References

2009 EPs
Spoon (band) albums
Merge Records EPs